Mighty Ships is a documentary television program produced by Exploration Production Inc. in Canada and aired on Discovery Channel Canada and also broadcast around the world. Each episode of the series follows a particular sea-going vessel and provides an insight into the ship and its crew.

The first episode of the tenth season, featuring the Faroes' largest ferry ship, MS Norröna, was first broadcast in Canada on 3 December 2017. The second episode, first aired on 10 December 2017, featured MSC Oscar, the largest container ship in the world.

Mighty Cruise Ships is a spin-off series focusing on cruise ships which began to air in late 2014.

Series overview
A typical episode follows the crew of a particular vessel as it prepares to embark upon a voyage and concludes at the end of the journey or once a particular job has been completed. The operational capabilities and technical aspects of the ship feature heavily in the series, whilst members of the ship's crew provide an insight into life at sea and provide a human perspective. The series also makes use of computer-generated animation to show scenes which would otherwise be unobtainable, such as underwater operations.

The series was started after the success of a one-off special on the Discovery Channel entitled Inside Queen Mary 2. The series has featured an extensive range of different types of marine vessels, with cruise ships, an aircraft carrier, fishing boats, dredgers and various types of cargo ships, naval and specialist ships being shown.

In a first for the series, season 7 includes a double-length episode about the maiden voyage of cruise ship Norwegian Breakaway and its construction and sea trials. Season 7 also includes a compilation episode showing vessels from the first six seasons.

The show's mixture of technical insight and human stories has proved popular with audiences.

Mighty Planes is a spin-off series in the same format but featuring aircraft rather than ships.

Episodes

One-off special

Season 1

Season 2

Season 3

Season 4

Season 5

Season 6

Season 7

Season 8

Season 9

Season 10

Mighty Cruise Ships

Mighty Cruise Ships is a spin-off series in a similar style, with each episode about the operations and voyages of a different cruise ship. It was first broadcast in Canada during late 2014.

Season 1

Season 2 
A second season of Mighty Cruise Ships aired on the Discovery Channel and repeated on the quest channel in the UK. Ships featured on this series included Carnival Vista, Royal Clipper, MV Viking Sea, MS Europa 2, MS Ocean Endeavour, MSC Divina.

Season 3

Season 4

Broadcasters

See also
 Mighty Trains
 Mighty Planes

References

External links
 Discovery Channel Canada Mighty Ships official Website
 Exploration Production Inc. official Website
 Episode guide – Locate TV

2008 Canadian television series debuts
2016 Canadian television series endings
2000s Canadian documentary television series
2000s Canadian reality television series
2010s Canadian documentary television series
2010s Canadian reality television series
Canadian television docudramas
Discovery Channel (Canada) original programming
Seven Network original programming